The Puerto Rico Public Finance Corporation (PFC) — (CFP)— is the government-owned corporation that issues bonds to finance the different agencies of the executive branch of the government of Puerto Rico. The corporation is a subsidiary of the Puerto Rico Government Development Bank.

See also
 List of bonds issued by Puerto Rico

References

External links
 Overview of the PFC at the Government Development Bank 

Finance in Puerto Rico
Government-owned corporations of Puerto Rico
Public debt of Puerto Rico